is a Japanese professional footballer who plays as a goalkeeper in the Belgian Pro League for club  Sint-Truiden.

Early life
Born in the United States to an American father and Japanese mother, Schmidt moved to Sendai, Japan at the age of two. He attended Chuo University.

Style of play
Schmidt is known for his ability with long balls to forwards and his frequency of coming off his line in precise timing to deal with threats early. He is also credited as a good penalty saver.

Club career
Schmidt played three consecutive seasons as a Designated Special Player for Kawasaki Frontale while at the Chuo University, before entering the professional ranks in 2013.

He later signed for Vegalta Sendai, but Schmidt played his first pro match during a one-month loan to Roasso Kumamoto in April 2014. After playing his first ever game with Vegalta in J. League Cup, he was again loaned to Roasso, this time until the end of 2015 season. A third loan was established in 2016, this time to Matsumoto Yamaga.

In 2019, he finally transferred overseas to Sint-Truiden in Belgium.

On 4 February 2023, he made his 100th appearance in the Jupiler Pro League against K.V. Kortrijk.

International career
On 30 August 2018, Schmidt received his first international callup from the Japan national football team for the Kirin Challenge Cup 2018. He made his debut appearance in a friendly match against Venezuela on 16 November 2018 and played his first competitive match for Japan on 17 January 2019 in the 2-1 win against Uzbekistan during the 2019 AFC Asian Cup.

In September 2022, he saved the team from a desperate pinch by stopping the penalty against Ecuador and was selected as MOM of the media. It was also the number one trend on Twitter.

In November 2022, he was selected for the 2022 FIFA World Cup team for the first time.

Career statistics

Club

International
Appearances and goals by national team and year

Honours 

Vegalta Sendai
 Emperor's Cup runner-up: 2018

Individual
 Japan Pro-Footballers Association Best XI: 2022

References

External links
 
 
 

Profile at Vegalta Sendai
Profile at Matsumoto Yamaga

1992 births
Living people
Chuo University alumni
Soccer players from Illinois
Japanese footballers
Japan international footballers
Japanese expatriate footballers
Japanese people of American descent
Japanese people of German descent
American soccer players
American sportspeople of Japanese descent
American people of German descent
J1 League players
J2 League players
Belgian Pro League players
Vegalta Sendai players
Roasso Kumamoto players
Matsumoto Yamaga FC players
Sint-Truidense V.V. players
Association football goalkeepers
2019 AFC Asian Cup players
Expatriate footballers in Belgium
2022 FIFA World Cup players